This is a list of Bien de Interés Cultural landmarks in the Province of Madrid, Spain.

A
Auditorium of Universidad Complutense

B
Banco Bilbao Vizcaya
Basilica of la Asunción de Nuestra Señora (Colmenar Viejo)
Bridge of Segovia (Madrid)
Bridge of Toledo (Madrid)
Former Banco Central Hispano headquarters

C
Casino de Madrid
Casita del Príncipe (El Escorial)
Cathedral of La Magdalena (Getafe)
Cathedral of los Santos Niños Justo y Pastor de Alcalá de Henares
Chapel of Obispo de Madrid
Church of el Carmen (Madrid)
Church of la Buena Dicha
Church of la Natividad de Nuestra Señora (San Martín de la Vega)
Church of la Natividad de Nuestra Señora, Valdetorres de Jarama
Church of la Asunción de Nuestra Señora (Algete)
Church of las Calatravas (Madrid)
Church of Nuestra Señora de Montserrat
Church of Nuestra Señora de la Asunción (Meco)
Church of Sacramento (Madrid)
Church of San Andrés (Madrid)
Church of San Antonio de los Alemanes
Church of San Antonio (Aranjuez)
Church of San Agustín (Madrid)
Church of San Fermín de los Navarros
Church of San Francisco de Sales (Madrid)
Church of San Ginés de Arlés (Madrid)
Church of San José (Madrid)
Church of San Manuel y San Benito (Madrid)
Church of San Marcos (Madrid)
Church of San Martín (Madrid)
Church of San Nicolás (Madrid)
Church of San Pedro Ad-vincula
Church of Santa Teresa y San José (Madrid)
Círculo de Bellas Artes
Colegio del Pilar (Madrid)
Convent of las Comendadoras de Santiago (Madrid)
Convent of las Monjas Trinitarias Descalzas
Convent of Madres Reparadoras
Convent of San Plácido (Madrid)
Convent of Santa Isabel
Cuartel del Conde-Duque

E
 Edificio Capitol
Escuelas Pías de San Fernando

F
 Faculty of Philosophy and Letters of the Complutense University
Four Seasons Hotel Madrid

G
Gate of la Latina
Gate of Toledo
Geological and Mining Institute of Spain
Goyeneche Palace, Nuevo Baztán

H
Hermitage of Santa María la Antigua (Madrid)
Hermitage of the Solitude
Hermitage of Virgen del Puerto (Madrid)
Homeopathic Institute and Hospital of San José
Hospital del Niño Jesús
Hospital of la Venerable Orden Tercera
Hospital of Maudes
Hotel Palace
House of Gallardo
House of Hermanitas de los Pobres
House of las Siete Chimeneas
House of Sombrerete
House-Museum of Lope de Vega

I
Instituto Lope de Vega
Instituto Valencia of Don Juan
International Institute (Madrid)

L
La Fuentecilla (Madrid)
La Niña de los Peines
La Fiesta de los Toros

M
Market of San Miguel
Ministry of Agriculture building
Monastery of Corpus Christi las Carboneras
Museo de Arte Contemporáneo (Madrid)
Museo del Traje
Museo Nacional de Artes Decorativas
Museum Cerralbo
Museum of Lázaro Galdiano

N
National Museum of Romanticism (Madrid)

O
Old Medicine School of San Carlos
Oratory of Caballero de Gracia

P
Palace of Altamira (Madrid)
Palace of Bauer
Palace of Canto del Pico (Torrelodones)
Palace of Communication
Palace of Duques de Pastrana
Palace of la Bolsa de Madrid
Palace of Linares
Palace of Longoria
Palace of Marqués de Grimaldi
Palace of marqués de Miraflores
Palace of Parcent
Palace of Santoña (Madrid)
Palace of the Marquis of Molins
Palace of Villahermosa
Palace of Villamejor
Palacio de la Marquesa de Sonora
Palacio de Velázquez
Palacio de Villena (Cadalso de los Vidrios)
Paseo del Prado

R
Real Casa de la Aduana
Real Hospicio de San Fernando
Royal Academy of Pharmacy
Royal Monastery of Santa Isabel
Royal Tapestry Factory
Ruins of Talamanca

S
San Cayetano Church, Madrid
San Sebastian Church, Madrid
School of Mining Engineering of Madrid
Spanish Cultural Heritage Institute
St. Michael's Basilica (Madrid)

T
Theatre of María Guerrero

W
Watchtower of Arrebatacapas
Watchtower of Torrelodones
Watchtower of Venturada

References 

 
Madrid
Bien de Interes Cultural